Advanapalli is a village in the Hosur taluk of Krishnagiri district, Tamil Nadu, India.

References

 

Villages in Krishnagiri district